James Hunter (born 1 November 2002) is an Irish cricketer. He made his List A debut for the Northern Knights in the 2020 Inter-Provincial Cup on 17 September 2020. Prior to his List A debut, Hunter played for the Ireland under-19 cricket team.

References

External links
 

2002 births
Living people
Irish cricketers
Northern Knights cricketers
Place of birth missing (living people)